Aleksandar Jovanović (born 17 December 1985) is a Serbian former footballer who played as a midfielder.

Career
During his career, Jovanović played almost exclusively in his hometown and represented OFK Niš, Sinđelić Niš, and most notably, Radnički Niš. He had two spells with Radnički between 2007 and 2019. In his second tenure at the club, Jovanović initially helped them return to the top flight after a decade (2012) and later secure a spot in European competitions after more than 30 years (2018). He also served as the team's captain, before leaving Radnički at the end of his contract in July 2019.

Statistics

Honours
Radnički Niš
 Serbian First League: 2011–12
 Serbian League East: 2008–09
Sinđelić Niš
 Serbian League East: 2009–10

References

External links
 Srbijafudbal profile
 
 
 

Association football midfielders
FK Kolubara players
FK Radnički Niš players
FK Sinđelić Niš players
OFK Beograd players
OFK Niš players
Serbian First League players
Serbian footballers
Serbian SuperLiga players
Sportspeople from Niš
1985 births
Living people